Maurice Camyré (March 10, 1915 – January 15, 2013) was a Canadian boxer who competed in the 1936 Summer Olympics. He was born in St. Vital. In 1936 he was eliminated in the first round of the welterweight class after losing his fight to Chester Rutecki.

External links
Maurice Camyré's profile at the Canadian Olympic Committee
Maurice Camyré's profile at Sports Reference.com
Maurice Camyré's obituary

1915 births
2013 deaths
Welterweight boxers
Olympic boxers of Canada
Boxers at the 1936 Summer Olympics
Sportspeople from Winnipeg
Canadian male boxers